The Grammy Award for Best Rock Song is an honor presented at the Grammy Awards, a ceremony that was established in 1958 and originally called the Gramophone Awards, to recording artists for quality songs in the rock music genre. Honors in several categories are presented at the ceremony annually by the National Academy of Recording Arts and Sciences of the United States to "honor artistic achievement, technical proficiency and overall excellence in the recording industry, without regard to album sales or chart position".

The award, reserved for songwriters, was first presented to English musician Sting in 1992. According to the category description guide for the 52nd Grammy Awards, the award honors new songs (containing both melody and lyrics) or songs "first achieving prominence" during the period of eligibility. Songs containing prominent samples or interpolations are not eligible.

The award goes to the songwriter. If the song contains samples or interpolations of earlier songs, the publisher and the original songwriter(s) can apply for a Winners Certificate.

Bruce Springsteen holds the records for the most wins and nominations, having won four awards from nine nominations. Other winners of multiple awards include Alanis Morissette and the bands Red Hot Chili Peppers and U2, each with two. Award-winning songs have been performed by American artists more than any other nationality, though they have also been performed by musicians or groups originating from Canada, Ireland, and the United Kingdom. There have been four instances in which one artist or group was nominated for two works in the same year: the group Aerosmith was nominated for both "Cryin'" and "Livin' on the Edge" in 1994, Melissa Etheridge received nominations for "Come to My Window" and "I'm the Only One" in 1995, Jakob Dylan of the Wallflowers won for "One Headlight" and was also nominated for "The Difference" in 1998, and U2 was nominated for the songs "Elevation" and "Walk On" in 2002. Coldplay holds the record for the most nominations without a win, with four.

Recipients

 The performing artist is only listed but does not receive the award.
 Showing the name of the songwriter(s), the nominated song and in parentheses the performer's name(s).

See also

 List of Grammy Award categories
 Rock and Roll Hall of Fame
 Rock Songs

References

General
  Note: User must select the "Rock" category as the genre under the search feature.
 

Specific

External links
Official site of the Grammy Awards

 
1992 establishments in the United States
Awards established in 1992
Rock Song
Song awards
Songwriting awards